is a Japanese actress and presenter. She provided the voice of Noodle from Damon Albarn and Jamie Hewlett's alternative rock virtual band Gorillaz from 2000 to 2017.

She performed on all the Phase One tour dates as Noodle: She performed Noodle's speaking voice at all tour dates as well as Noodle's backing vocals, she was also playing the second guitar. (It is a popular misconception that Miho Hatori performed on the Gorillaz tour.) She is also the speaking voice of Noodle in Gorillaz' promotional interview CD, 'The Apex Tapes', as well as all live radio interviews and 'G-Bites' short films from Phase 1.

She has also sung with JC Connington's rock group JUNKSTAR on the track Going Nowhere as well as featuring in various BBC productions. (Jonny Vegas's Ideal series 1,2 3,4,5 & 6 Jonathan Creek, Hiroshima & Brain-Jitsu). Her film credit includes Foster, Swinging with the Finkels, I Like London In the Rain &  One Minute Past Midnight which won the short film of the year in 2005 at Chicago Film Festival.

Haruka had a constant role in kids' gaming show PXG in 2005, where she hosts alongside Kentaro Suyama as the voice of 'Game Girl'.

She works extensively as a voice-over artist like in the GameCube's 2005 Battalion Wars as the Solar Empire empress.

Training 
Haruka trained at the Guildford School of Acting. She is also a master of the martial art Sanjuro, teaching regularly in London.

Filmography

Films

Television

Video games

Short films

References

External links 
 
 JC Connington's JUNKSTAR band - profile
 

1977 births
Living people
Alumni of the Guildford School of Acting
English people of Japanese descent
Japanese expatriates in England
Japanese video game actresses
Japanese voice actresses